London is a surname of English origin, derived from the city of London, and a unisex given name.

People with the surname London
Adam London (born 1988), English cricketer
Ann London Scott (1929–1975), American feminist
Artur London (1915–1986), Czechoslovakian communist politician
Bobby London (born 1950), American comic artist
Brian London (1934–2021), British boxer
Drake London (born 2001), American football player
Frank London, American trumpeter, bandleader and composer
Fritz London (1900–1954), German physicist, brother of Heinz London
Gene London (1931–2020), American television presenter
George London (1920–1985), American operatic baritone
George London (1681–1714), English nurseryman and garden designer
Greg London (born 1966), American impressionist
Heinz London (1907–1970), German physicist, brother of Fritz London
Herbert London (1939–2018), American conservative, professor, and author
Jack London (1876–1916), American author
Jason London (born 1972), American actor
Jay London (born 1966), American comedian
Jeremy London (born 1972), American actor
Jerry London (born 1947), American film and television director and producer
Joan London (1901–1971), American writer
Joan London (born 1948), Australian fiction writer
Joe London, American record producer and songwriter
John London (1942–2000), American musician and songwriter
Julie London (1926–2000), American singer and actress
LaCale London (born 1997), American football player
LaToya London (born 1978), American singer and actress
Lauren London (born 1984), American actress and model
Laurie London (born 1944), English singer
Meyer London (1871–1926), American congressman
Pamela London (born 1973), Guyanese boxer
Paul London (born 1980), American professional wrestler
Perry London (1931–1992), American psychologist, theorist, and academic administrator
Solomon London (1661–1748), Lithuanian author and publisher
Sondra London (born 1947), American true crime author
Stacy London (born 1969), American fashion consultant and television presenter
Stan London (c. 1925 – 2020), doctor for the St. Louis Cardinals
Tom London (1889–1963), American actor
Yaron London (born 1940), Israeli media personality

People with the given name London
London Breed (born 1974), American politician and current Mayor of San Francisco
London Fletcher (born 1975), American football player
London Hughes (born 1989), British comedian, television writer and presenter
London Lamar (born 1990), American politician and Member of the Tennessee House of Representatives
London Perrantes (born 1994), American basketball player for Hapoel Gilboa Galil of the Israeli Basketball Premier League
London on da Track (born 1991), birth name London Tyler Holmes, American record producer, rapper, and songwriter

Fictional characters
London Tipton, heiress of the Boston Tipton Hotel in The Suite Life of Zack & Cody

English toponymic surnames
Unisex given names